Andrei Aleksandrovich Mikhalev (born February 23, 1978) is a Belarusian former professional ice hockey forward. He most notably played for Dynamo Minsk of the Kontinental Hockey League.

Playing career
Mikhalev began his professional career in 1995 and played five season with Yunost Minsk. Between 2002 and 2008 he played nine season with Keramin Minsk before earning a spot with the top level Dyanmo Minsk for the 2008–09 season.

He played in North America during the 1996–97 season, with the Nashville Nighthawks of the Central Hockey League and the Chicoutimi Saguenéens of the Quebec Major Junior Hockey League.

International play
Mikhalev was selected for the Belarus national men's ice hockey team in the 2010 Winter Olympics. He also participated at the 2010 IIHF World Championship as a member of the Belarus National men's ice hockey team. He previously represented Belarus at the 1997 World Junior Championships, and the 2005, 2006, 2007, 2008, and 2009 Ice Hockey World Championships.

Career statistics

Regular season and playoffs

International

References

External links
 

1978 births
Living people
Belarusian ice hockey right wingers
Chicoutimi Saguenéens (QMJHL) players
Nashville Nighthawks players
HC Dinamo Minsk players
Ice hockey players at the 2010 Winter Olympics
Olympic ice hockey players of Belarus
Ice hockey people from Minsk
Doping cases in ice hockey
Belarusian expatriate sportspeople in Canada
Belarusian expatriate sportspeople in the United States